Songs of Heaven is yFriday's first worship CD, released in 2003.

Track listing
 Songs of Heaven (4:10)
 God of Creation (3:51)
 Your Mercy Falls (4:28)
 Glorious One (3:50)
 Come in Power (4:08)
 Falling Down (4:15)

Personnel
 Ken Riley - Vocals & guitars
 Gav Richards - Keyboards, guitars & backing vocals
 Danny Smith - Bass & backing vocals
 Dez Minto - Drums

YFriday albums
2003 EPs
Survivor Records EPs